Xanthostemon verticillatus is a species of trees from the plant family Myrtaceae endemic to the Wet Tropics rainforests of northeastern Queensland.

References

verticillatus
Myrtales of Australia
Flora of Queensland
Taxa named by Cyril Tenison White
Taxa named by William Douglas Francis